The Jucu River is a river of Espírito Santo state in eastern Brazil.

The estuary of the river is in the Jacarenema Ecological Reserve, a  conservation area in the city of Vila Velha.
The mangroves of the estuary have suffered from pollution from waste water and garbage washed down from further up the river.

See also
List of rivers of Espírito Santo

References

Brazilian Ministry of Transport

Rivers of Espírito Santo